The 2018–19 Copa de la Reina was the 34th edition of the Copa de la Reina, Spain's annual field hockey cup competition for women. It was held from 22 to 24 March 1029 in Madrid, at Club de Campo.

Club de Campo won the tournament for the 16th time, defeating Real Club de Polo 5–2 in the final. UD Taburiente finished in third place after defeating Júnior 3–2 in penalties following a 0–0 draw.

Qualified teams
The tournament was contested by the top eight ranked teams from the first half of the 2018–19 season of the Liga Iberdrola.

Atlètic Terrassa
CD Terrassa
Club de Campo
Júnior
Real Club de Polo
Real Sociedad
Sanse Complutense
UD Taburiente

Officials
The following umpires were appointed by the RFEH to officiate the tournament:

Sandra Adell (ESP)
Gema Calderón (ESP)
Pilar López (ESP)
María Mercedes Romero (ESP)
Cristina Pérez (ESP)
Núria Ribó (ESP)
Montserrat Solórzano (ESP)
Laura Trujillo (ESP)

Results

Knockouts

Quarterfinals

First to fourth place classification

Semi-finals

Third and fourth place

Final

Awards

References

External links
Real Federación Española de Hockey

field hockey
field hockey
Spain